Chrysander Antonio Botha (born 13 July 1988) is an international rugby union player for Namibia.

Rugby career

He made his test debut against Zimbabwe in 2008 and also played against  in the 2011 Rugby World Cup, scoring a try.

He played in both legs of the ' promotion/relegation matches after the 2013 Super Rugby season, which saw the  regain their spot in Super Rugby.

It was announced on 31 July 2014 the Botha had signed for Aviva Premiership side Exeter Chiefs.

Botha is currently an assistant coach of the Namibia rugby team under Allister Coetzee

Notes

References

External links
 Chrysander Botha at ESPN Scrum

1988 births
Living people
Eastern Province Elephants players
Exeter Chiefs players
Expatriate rugby union players in England
Falcons (rugby union) players
Golden Lions players
Lions (United Rugby Championship) players
Namibia international rugby union players
Namibian rugby union players
Rugby union fullbacks
Rugby union players from Walvis Bay
Southern Kings players
Welwitschias players